Klub malega nogometa Puntar, commonly referred to as KMN Puntar or simply Puntar, was a futsal club from Tolmin, Slovenia. The club was founded in 1974.

Honours
Slovenian League
 Winners (2): 2006–07, 2008–09

Slovenian Cup
 Winners (3): 2003–04, 2006–07, 2007–08

Slovenian Supercup
 Winners (2): 2008, 2009

References

External links
UEFA profile

Futsal clubs established in 1974
Futsal clubs in Slovenia
1974 establishments in Slovenia
2019 disestablishments in Slovenia